Roswell High School (RHS) is a public senior high school in Roswell, New Mexico. It is a part of the Roswell Independent School District. Established in 1913, it is the oldest public high school in the city. The colors of RHS are: Dark Crimson Red, White and Black, their mascot is a Coyote. Enrollment at the school currently stands at 1,311.

Academics

Student body statistics

Athletics

RHS competes in the New Mexico Activities Association, a AAAAA school in District 4. Their district includes Artesia High School, Goddard High School and Lovington High School.

RHS has captured 40 state championships since 1914.

Notable people

Alumni
Cormac Antram, Franciscan priest on the Navajo Nation, broadcaster of long-running English/Navajo radio program The Padre's Hour
Tom Brookshier, NFL defensive back and broadcaster
Glenn Dennis, founder of International UFO Museum and Research Center
Pete Jaquess, NFL defensive back
DonTrell Moore, NFL running back
Cliff Pirtle, New Mexico state senator
Paul Smith, NFL defensive lineman

Staff
Eddie Reese, Olympic swimming coach (coached at Roswell High early in career now retired because Roswell High School no longer has a swimming team)

See also 
List of high schools in New Mexico
Roswell Independent School District
Goddard High School
University High School

References

External links
 Official School Webpage

Roswell, New Mexico
Schools in Chaves County, New Mexico
Public high schools in New Mexico
1913 establishments in New Mexico